Nikola Janković (born February 13, 1994) is a Serbian professional basketball player for KK FMP of the ABA League.

Professional career

Early years
Janković began training basketball in hometown club Ekonomac. Then he played for the youth system of FMP Železnik and Crvena zvezda. After turning 18, in 2012 he refused to sign a professional contract with the club from Belgrade, only to move to Belgium's Spirou Charleroi. Over the season, he averaged 5.2 points and 2.6 rebounds per game in his first international season.

Before the 2013–14 season, he moved to Verviers-Pepinster. In the new team he had much bigger role, averaging 11.4 points and 5.7 rebounds over 34 games played. In 2014–15 season, he appeared in just 18 games, averaging 16.1 points and 6.2 rebounds in 24.9 minutes per game. On June 5, 2015, he returned to Spirou Charleroi, only to part ways with the team in late August.

Mega Leks

Following the departure from Spirou Charleroi, he trained with the Serbian team Mega Leks, also playing friendly games with the –team starting with September. On September 18, 2015, he signed with Mega Leks. In February 2016, Mega Leks won the first trophy in the club's history, as they won the 2016 Serbian Cup. The 2016–17 season was the most successful season for the club since the founding; they also advanced to the finals of the 2015–16 ABA League, where they lost to Crvena zvezda. Over 29 games played in the ABA League, Janković averaged 9.3 points and 6.1 rebounds per game.

Union Olimpija
On August 17, 2016, Janković signed a contract with the Slovenian team Union Olimpija. On March 16, 2017, he was named the ABA League MVP for the 2016–17 season. He finished the regular season with an index rating of 19.24 per game. Janković averaged 16.6 points, 7.3 rebounds per game and was the fifth best scorer and the fifth best rebounder.

Sakarya BB
On July 10, 2017, Janković signed with Turkish club Sakarya BB.

Movistar Estudiantes
On July 6, 2018, Janković signed a 1+1 deal with Movistar Estudiantes of the Liga ACB.

Partizan
On December 31, 2018, Janković signed with Serbian club Partizan for the rest of the 2018–19 season.

On June 15, 2020, Janković tested positive for COVID-19.

Río Breogán
On December 28, 2021, Janković signed with Río Breogán of the Liga ACB.

Serbian national team
Janković has successfully performed for the younger representative categories. At the Under-18 European Championships he won two medals - a silver in Poland 2011 and bronze in Lithuania/Latvia 2012. In 2013 he was part of the team that came up to silver medal at the Under-19 World Championship. In 2014 he won another bronze medal - this time with the youth team at the Under-20 European Championship. He was named in the All-Tournament ideal five, averaging 15.5 points and 9.1 rebounds per game.

Awards and accomplishments
 Under-20 European Championship All-Tournament Team (2014)

References

External links

 Nikola Janković at aba-liga.com
 Nikola Janković at draftexpress.com
 Nikola Janković at eurobasket.com
 Nikola Janković at euroleague.net
 Nikola Janković at fiba.com

1994 births
Living people
ABA League players
Basketball League of Serbia players
CB Breogán players
CB Estudiantes players
KK Crvena zvezda youth players
KK Mega Basket players
KK FMP players
KK Olimpija players
KK Partizan players
KK Podgorica players
Liga ACB players
People from Vranje
Power forwards (basketball)
RBC Pepinster players
Sakarya BB players
Serbian expatriate basketball people in Belgium
Serbian expatriate basketball people in Montenegro
Serbian expatriate basketball people in Slovenia
Serbian expatriate basketball people in Turkey
Serbian men's basketball players
Spirou Charleroi players